Todor Atanasov (31 March 1954 – 8 November 2020) was a Bulgarian footballer who played as an attacking midfielder. He spent the majority of his career with Cherno More Varna.

References

1954 births
2020 deaths
Bulgarian footballers
PFC CSKA Sofia players
PFC Cherno More Varna players
First Professional Football League (Bulgaria) players
Association football midfielders
People from Kazanlak